The Swiss ambassador in Ankara is the official representative of the Government in Bern to the Government of Turkey.

List of representatives

References 

 
Turkey
Switzerland